Duan Junyi (Chinese: 段君毅; March 13, 1910 – March 8, 2004) was a politician of the People's Republic of China. 

After the fall of Gang of Four, Duan served as the Minister of Railways of China. In October 1978, he became the first secretary of CPC Henan Committee, director of Henan Revolutionary Committee, and the first political commissar of the provincial military region. 

From January 1981 to May 1984, Duan served as the first secretary of CPC Beijing Committee, and the first political commissar of Beijing Defense Area. 

In September 1982, Duan was appointed as a standing committee member of the Central Advisory Committee of CPC. He retired in October 1992.

Duan was a member of 10th and 11th Central Committees of the Communist Party of China.

1910 births
2004 deaths
People's Republic of China politicians from Henan
Chinese Communist Party politicians from Henan
Politicians from Puyang
Political office-holders in Beijing
Governors of Henan
Chinese people in rail transport
CCP committee secretaries of Henan